Vladimir Karalić (born 22 March 1984, in Belgrade) is a Bosnian-Herzegovinian retired footballer who last played in the First League of the Republika Srpska as a forward.

Karalić has represented Bosnia and Herzegovina national football team once in 2007.

Club career

Sun Pegasus
On 11 January 2013, Karalić joined Hong Kong First Division League club Sun Pegasus from Rudar Prijedor for an undisclosed fee. After the season ended, Karalić was released by Sun Pegasus.

International career
Karalić has made an appearance for an unofficial Bosnia and Herzegovina team, a friendly match against Poland on 15 December 2007.

Career statistics

Hong Kong
 As of 11 January 2013. The following table only shows statistics in Hong Kong.

References

External links
 

1984 births
Living people
Footballers from Belgrade
Association football forwards
Bosnia and Herzegovina footballers
FK Borac Banja Luka players
PAOK FC players
FK Sarajevo players
NK Primorje players
IF Sylvia players
NK GOŠK Gabela players
FK Sloboda Tuzla players
FK BSK Banja Luka players
FK Laktaši players
Polonia Bytom players
NK Travnik players
NK Iskra Bugojno players
FK Rudar Prijedor players
TSW Pegasus FC players
Premier League of Bosnia and Herzegovina players
Slovenian PrvaLiga players
Superettan players
Hong Kong First Division League players
First League of the Republika Srpska players
Bosnia and Herzegovina expatriate footballers
Expatriate footballers in Greece
Bosnia and Herzegovina expatriate sportspeople in Greece
Expatriate footballers in Slovenia
Bosnia and Herzegovina expatriate sportspeople in Slovenia
Expatriate footballers in Sweden
Bosnia and Herzegovina expatriate sportspeople in Sweden
Expatriate footballers in Poland
Bosnia and Herzegovina expatriate sportspeople in Poland
Expatriate footballers in Hong Kong
Bosnia and Herzegovina expatriate sportspeople in Hong Kong